"Be Mine" is a song by David Gray. It was released on 7 April 2003 as the second and final single from his sixth studio album A New Day at Midnight. The single peaked on the UK Singles Chart at number 23. "Be Mine" is also included on the album The Best of David Gray released in October 2016.

Track listings
UK CD single
 "Be Mine" (Radio Remix) – 3:52
 "Loverboy" – 4:30
 "Falling Down the Mountainside" (Live at the BBC, December 2002) – 4:40

The Best of David Gray 
 "Babylon" - 3:38
 "You're the World to Me" - 3:37
 "Sail Away" - 5:15
 "The One I Love" - 3:28
 "Alibi" - 4:36
 "Smoke Without Fire" - 2:55
 "Flame Turns Blue" - 4:51
 "Be Mine" - 3:51
 "This Year's Love" - 4:06
 "Fugitive" - 3:43
 "Please Forgive Me" - 5:34
 "Only the Wine" - 2:52
 "Snow in Vegas (feat. LeAnn Rimes)" - 3:30
 "Back in the World" - 3:58
 "The Other Side" - 4:27
 "Enter Lightly" - 4:50

References

David Gray (musician) songs
2003 singles
Songs written by David Gray (musician)
Music videos directed by Vaughan Arnell
2003 songs
East West Records singles